Gogges, also called goggizes, goglies, and stripta makaronia ('twisted macaroni') is a kind of pasta made in the Peloponnese, especially the provinces of Argolis and Laconia. They resemble seashells and are similar to cavatelli or orecchiette as made in Apulia, though gogges are usually thicker. Gogges are generally made only from flour, water, and salt, and no egg.

They are made by first rolling the dough out into cylinders roughly the thickness of the little finger, then cutting the cylinder into sections  in length. In the final step each section is pressed flat and curled, in one fluid motion using the fingers. The rolling can be done on any surface, but is usually done on grooved wooden board to give the pasta its exterior texture. If not consumed fresh they are left to dry between two clean linen sheets for 2-3 days.

For , they are served as a snack or meze with oil and mizithra, though at other times of the year, they are served as a main dish. Today, though still commonly made at home by hand, they are commercially produced in local pasta factories and served in taverns and restaurants.

References

External links

Gogges
Gogges
Greek pasta
Laconia
Argolis
Greek cuisine